The 1954 Campeonato Paulista da Primeira Divisão, organized by the Federação Paulista de Futebol, was the 53rd season of São Paulo's top professional football league. Corinthians won the title for the 15th time. Juventus and Ypiranga  were relegated and the top scorer was Palmeiras's Humberto Tozzi with 36 goals.

Championship
The championship was disputed in a double-round robin system, with the team with the most points winning the title and the two teams with the fewest points being relegated. In that season, São Bento de São Caetano entered the championship, that team being the product of a merge between Comercial and São Caetano EC.

Top Scores

References

Campeonato Paulista seasons
Paulista